The following lists events that happened during 1859 in Australia.

Incumbents

Governors
Governors of the Australian colonies:
Governor of New South Wales – Sir William Denison
Governor of Queensland – Sir George Bowen
Governor of South Australia – Sir Richard MacDonnell
Governor of Tasmania – Sir Henry Young
Governor of Victoria – Sir Henry Barkly
Governor of Western Australia as a Crown Colony – Sir Arthur Kennedy

Premiers
Premiers of the Australian colonies:
Premier of New South Wales – Charles Cowper, William Forster
Premier of Queensland – Robert Herbert
Premier of South Australia – Richard Hanson
Premier of Tasmania – Francis Smith
Premier of Victoria – John O'Shanassy, William Nicholson

Events
 14 May – Melbourne Football Club is founded.
 6 June – The colony of Queensland is established by decree of Queen Victoria.
 July – Geelong Football Club is founded.
 5 August – The passenger steamship SS Admella is shipwrecked on a submerged reef near Mount Gambier South Australia with the loss of 89 lives.
 6 October – Thomas Austin takes 24 rabbits and 5 hares to Australia in order to release them there as a game. They will multiply exponentially.
 The first permanent educational institution for girls, the East Leigh, is founded in Melbourne by Elizabeth Tripp.

Births
 24 March – Hugh de Largie, Western Australian politician (born in the United Kingdom) (d. 1947)
 23 April – Bella Guerin, feminist and suffragist (d. 1923)
 25 April – Joseph Maiden, botanist (born in the United Kingdom) (d. 1925)
 16 June – John Russell, impressionist painter (d. 1930)
 28 November – Richard Godfrey Rivers, artist (born in the United Kingdom) (d. 1925)

References

 
Australia
Years of the 19th century in Australia